Ka Haka ʻUla O Keʻelikōlani (KHUOK) College of Hawaiian Language is one of nine colleges and programs at the University of Hawaii at Hilo. KHUOK offers BA, MA and PhD programs in Hawaiian language and related topics including linguistics, literature, language acquisition, and indigenous cultural revitalization.

KHUOK was founded in 1997 and was named after Ruth Keʻelikōlani. Its motto is Language is the fiber that binds us to our cultural identity (in Hawaiian: ʻO ka ʻŌlelo ke Kaʻā o ka Mauli).

Academic programs 
The academic programs at KHUOK include degrees at the BA, MA, and PhD levels.

Bachelor of Arts 
The BA in Hawaiian Studies at KHUOK offers two specializations: Continuing the Culture and Monitoring the Culture.

Master of Arts 
The MA in Hawaiian Language and Literature prepares scholars to carry out research on Hawaiian literary resources from the 19th and 20th century.

PhD 
The PhD in Hawaiian and Indigenous Language and Culture Revitalization trains students to take leadership positions in language revitalization programs in Indigenous communities around the world.

Facilities 
KHUOK is housed in Haleʻōlelo, a $21 million facility in the campus of UH Hilo, designed by WCIT Architects in Honolulu. Haleʻōlelo opened in spring of 2014.

Notable faculty 
Notable faculty include
 Keiki Kawaiʻaeʻa, Director
 Glenn Kalena Silva, Professor
 William Pila Wilson, Professor
 Kauanoe Kamanā, Associate Professor
 Larry Kimura, Associate Professor

References

External links 
 "Hawaiian Language Revitalization a Model for Alaska." KCAW website, posted June 9, 2016. Retrieved February 26, 2017.
 "Opening Held for College of Hawaiian Language Building." BigIslandNow website, posted January 13, 2014. Retrieved February 26, 2017.
 "New Haleʻolelo at UH College of Hawaiian Language." BigIslandVideoNews website, posted January 12, 2012. Retrieved February 26, 2017. 
 "Kualono." Retrieved February 26, 2017.

Education in Hawaii County, Hawaii
University of Hawaiʻi
Buildings and structures in Hilo, Hawaii
1997 establishments in Hawaii
Educational institutions established in 1997
Hawaiian language
Language revival